National Botanic Gardens Shah Alam ( or TBNSA) is a national botanic garden in Shah Alam, Selangor, Malaysia. It is incorporated in the Ministry of Agriculture and Food Industries. With area of 817 hectares, it is the habitat of flora and fauna, also a recreational destination in the Klang Valley. As of August 2021, the director of TBNSA is Siti Zubaidah binti Mohamad.

History
National Botanic Gardens Shah Alam (TBNSA) was constructed on 24 April 1986, known as Taman Pertanian Bukit Cerakah (the Bukit Cherakah Agricultural Park). It is located in the Bukit Cherakah Forest Reserve that was constituted in 1909. In the year of 1991, the name was changed to Taman Pertanian Malaysia Bukit Cahaya Seri Alam. In the year of 2007, TBNSA has finally got its current name, Taman Botani Negara Shah Alam. The garden was established on the forest reserve area of Bukit Cerakah which served as a reservoir for the water for the people of Shah Alam.

The forest is a red meranti-keruing forest, consist of various Dipterocarpaceae such as Seraya and Meranti. There are also a few hills that can be hiked along the paved trail. The highest point is the Bukit Sapu Tangan (200m asl), on top of the hill, there's a lookout point that provide the view of the city of Shah Alam. The trails from the hill connect with adjacent forested areas outside TBNSA, including Shah Alam Community Forest.

Vision & Mission
TBNSA is developed to provide a national scientific education centre and also act as a natural resource conservation centre for the development of botanical, horticultural, floricultural, agriculture and other related field in Malaysia. TBNSA also functions as a community awareness centre that aims to create excitement and induce the community to appreciate the beauty and benefit of our own local plants variety which is also our national heritage.

Objectives & Functions
 To be an integrated agricultural-based tourism centre.
 To be an informative agricultural-based tourism centre in the field of farming, aquaculture and livestock.
 To be an agricultural-based tourism centre that could also be a centre for scientific researches and studies in the environmental and agricultural field.
 To be an agricultural-based tourism centre with learning and recreation facility based on Malaysian cultural characteristics.
 To be an agricultural-based tourism centre that stresses on the environmental sustainability as well flora and fauna.

Attractions

Park & Garden
 Animal Park
 Ornamental Garden
 4 Seasons Temperate House (RISEM)
 Spice & Beverages Garden
 Cactus Garden
 Tropical Fruits Garden
 Paddy Field
 Herbs & Medicinal Garden

Dams & Lakes
 Sungai Baru Dam
 Air Kuning Dam
 Mystery Tunnel
 Pool C

Village & Chalet
 Kampung Idaman
 Rumah Perlis
 Rumah Kedah
 Rumah Pulau Pinang
 Rumah Perak
 Rumah Negeri Sembilan
 Rumah Melaka
 Rumah Johor
 Rumah Pahang
 Rumah Terengganu
 Rumah Kelantan
 Perkampungan Budaya
 Camar Rimba

Operating hours

Park operating hours

Entrance fee

Conservation fee (Compulsory)

Conservation fee for Four Seasons Temperate House (RISEM)

Address
Taman Botani Negara Shah Alam,
Bukit Cahaya Seri Alam,
40000 Shah Alam,
Selangor Darul Ehsan.

See also
 List of tourist attractions in Selangor

References

External links

 National Botanic Gardens Shah Alam Official website

Botanical gardens in Malaysia
Gardens in Malaysia
Tourist attractions in Selangor
Nature sites of Selangor